Gene Alan Chilton (born March 27, 1964) is a former professional American football player from Houston, Texas. He played center for six seasons for the St. Louis Cardinals,  where he was drafted in the 3rd round, 59th overall, Kansas City Chiefs, and New England Patriots. 

Chilton is a graduate of Memorial High School in Houston, Texas.

References

1964 births
Living people
Players of American football from Houston
American football centers
American football offensive tackles
St. Louis Cardinals (football) players
Kansas City Chiefs players
New England Patriots players
Texas Longhorns football players
Memorial High School (Hedwig Village, Texas) alumni